Dieumerci Mukoko Amale (born 17 October 1998) is a Congolese professional footballer who plays as a right-back for DHJ. He represents the DR Congo national team.

Playing career
Amale spent his early career playing for DCMP in his native DR Congo. He moved to the Moroccan club DHJ on 5 November 2020.

International career
Amale debuted with the DR Congo in a 3–2 friendly loss to Rwanda on 18 September 2019.

References

External links
FDB Profile
NFT Profile

1998 births
Living people
Footballers from Kinshasa
Democratic Republic of the Congo footballers
Democratic Republic of the Congo international footballers
Association football fullbacks
Daring Club Motema Pembe players
Difaâ Hassani El Jadidi players
Linafoot players
Botola players
Democratic Republic of the Congo expatriate footballers
Democratic Republic of the Congo expatriate sportspeople in Morocco
Expatriate footballers in Morocco
21st-century Democratic Republic of the Congo people